Kuriany can refer to:

 Kuriany, Poland, a village in Podlaskie Voivodeship
 Kuriany, Ukraine, a village in Ternopil Oblast